Eyuphuro is a Mozambican band. Eyuphuro's music is a combination of traditional African music and western popular music. Eyuphuro's music is sung mostly in Makua, a Bantu language. The name of the band means "whirlwind" in Macua.

History
Omar Issa, Gimo Remane and Zena Bacar founded Eyuphuro in 1981. Eyuphuro released the successful album Mama Mosambiki before its initial breakup in 1990. In 1998, singer Zena Bacar reformed Eyuphuro and in 2001 they released a new album, Yellela. They made three albums over 25 years that were sold around the world, but the band members never saw these profits.

Original members
 Zena Bacar
 Omar Issa
 Gimo Remane

Current members
 Issufo Manuel
 Belarmino Rita Godeiros
 Jorge Cossa
 Mahamudo Selimane
 Firmino Luis Hunguana
The album Yellela also includes musicians who are not members of the band; singer Mariamo Mussa Hohberg, saxophonist Orlando da Conceicao and keyboardist Benedito Mazbuko.

Discography
Albums
 Mama Mosambiki (1990)
 Yellela (2001)

Contributing artist
 Unwired: Africa (2000, World Music Network)
 The Rough Guide to Acoustic Africa (2013, World Music Network)

References

Mozambican music
Real World Records artists